Dillon Township is an inactive township in Phelps County, in the U.S. state of Missouri.

Dillon Township has the name of John A. Dillon, a pioneer citizen who was active in local politics.

References

Townships in Missouri
Townships in Phelps County, Missouri